Lamard may refer to:
LaMard Township, Wayne County, Illinois
Lamerd, a city in Iran